Devold is a Norwegian surname. Notable people with the surname include:

Finn Devold (1902–1977), Norwegian marine biologist
Hallvard Devold (1898–1957), Norwegian Arctic explorer
Kristin Krohn Devold (born 1961), Norwegian politician
Kristin K. Devold (born 1939), Norwegian politician

See also
Devold Peak, mountain of Queen Maud Land, Antarctica

Norwegian-language surnames

de:Devold